Secret Agent is the twelfth album by Chick Corea, recorded and released in 1978. It is a musically diverse release that features Corea’s long-standing collaborators Joe Farrell on reeds and woodwinds, percussionist Airto, and vocalist Gayle Moran (Corea’s wife). Al Jarreau sings “Hot News Blues”, and a four piece brass section and string quartet also appear.

This album is one of three that Corea released in 1978, along with The Mad Hatter and Friends in what was called an "almost impossibly active year". 1978 also featured the release of live albums An Evening with Herbie Hancock & Chick Corea: In Concert and RTF Live: The Complete Concert (4LP Box Set) with Return to Forever.

Track listing
All pieces are composed by Chick Corea unless otherwise noted.

Side one
"Golden Dawn" – 3:39
"Slinky" – 5:42
"Mirage" – 2:11
"Drifting" – 4:09
"Glebe St. Blues" – 6:58

Side two
"Fickle Funk" – 5:05
"Bagatelle, No. 4" (Béla Bartók) – 3:34
"Hot News Blues" – 6:18
"Central Park" – 5:22

Personnel
 Chick Corea – acoustic piano (A1, B2); Fender Rhodes electric piano (A2, A3, A5, B1, B3, B4); Hohner clavinet (A5, B4 ); Minimoog, Multimoog & Oberheim 8-voice synthesizers (A1 to A4, B2 to B4); backing vocals (B4); percussion
 Allen Vizzutti – trumpet (A1, A2, A4, A5, B4); flugelhorn (B1)
 Bob Zottola – trumpet (A1, A2, A4, A5, B4)
 Ron Moss – trombone (A5, B4); bass trombone (B4)
 Jim Pugh – trombone (A1 to A5, B4); bass trombone (B4)
 Joe Farrell – flute & alto flute (A2, A4); bass flute (A4); tenor saxophone (A5); soprano saxophone (B1)
 Bunny Brunel – fretless bass (A1, A2, A4 to B1, B3, B4)
 Tom Brechtlein – drums (A1, A2, A4, A5, B3, B4)
 Airto Moreira – percussion (A2, A4, B4); Hi-hat (B1)
 Charles Veal – violin & viola (A1, A5, B4); backing vocals (B4)
 Carol Shive – violin (A1, A5, B4); backing vocals (B4)
 Paula Hochhalter – cello (A1, A5, B4); backing vocals (B4)
 Gayle Moran – lead vocals (A4, A5, B2); backing vocals (B4)
 Al Jarreau – lead vocals (B3)

Charts

References

External links 
 Chick Corea - Secret Agent (1978) album review by Dave Connolly, credits & releases at AllMusic
 Chick Corea - Secret Agent (1978) album releases & credits at Discogs

1978 albums
Chick Corea albums
Polydor Records albums